Socialism or Barbarism is a book about globalism, U.S. socialism and capitalist systems by Hungarian Marxist philosopher and economist István Mészáros. It was published in 2001 and is composed of two parts, the first part is an expanded version of an essay of the same title originally published in 2000; the second part consists of an interview conducted in 1998.

The term "socialism or barbarism" refers to a quote by Rosa Luxemburg.

Summary 
Mészáros is convinced that the future of socialism will be decided in the U.S. and sees its main obstacle to be the globalization of Keynesian neo-liberalism. He reckons that the 21st century will coincide with the "third stage of capitalism", which Mészáros characterizes as the barbarous global competition for domination between a plurality of free-market capitalist systems. His examination of the history of American capitalism predicts several eminent ramifications to this struggle: imperialist driven territorial expansion in the Middle East, the continuation and increase of NATO aggression, increased infrastructure weakening with major degradation in the quality of life for the lower class, and eventually a proxy war with China via U.S.'s defense treaties with Japan.

Much of the book is devoted to applying Marx's nineteenth century theories to current events, such as the environment:
 

What Mészáros prescribes is a labor union socialist solution, specifically the syndicalist form of socialism that Samuel Gompers had abandoned when the AFL provided the a workforce for the U.S. involvement in World War I. He advocates a Marxist form of socialism:

See also 
 Alexander Zinoviev
 The Shock Doctrine by Naomi Klein
 Multitudes by Negri & Hardt
 Hegemony or Survival by Noam Chomsky
 Anti-globalization movement

References

Bibliography

External links 
 Book Review by the History Cooperative
 Quotes To Ponder by Stephen Gowans
 Mészáros interview with the Monthly Review

2001 non-fiction books
Books about foreign relations of the United States
Books critical of capitalism
Books about globalization
Communist books
Marxist books
Political books
Political terminology
Works by István Mészáros